Legs4Africa is a British registered charity. It rescues unwanted prosthetic legs,  dismantles and services the components and ships them to sub-Saharan African countries such as Gambia, Ghana, Benin, Tanzania, Kenya, Uganda, Liberia and Rwanda, where they can be modified and provided to amputees at no cost. It also works with existing services and communities to provide physical and emotional rehabilitation to African amputees.

It was founded in 2014 by Tom Williams; the registered address is in Arnesby, in Leicestershire. In 2014, the charity raised £6000 with a Crowdfunder campaign. In April 2014, Legs4Africa sent a van carrying about 500 used prosthetic legs to The Gambia. They were donated to the Royal Victoria Teaching Hospital in Banjul, where prostheses were particularly needed for victims of land mines and diabetes. Another 1000 were sent to The Gambia in January 2015 and in June 2016 about 500 were shipped to Tanzania.

In 2022's December, the charity raised £20,000 to help amputees in Northern Ghana. It has rescued over 14,000 prosthetic legs. During the 2023 King's New Year Honours, Tom Williams was awarded the Order of the British Empire.

References 

2014 establishments in the United Kingdom
Charities based in Bristol
Charities based in Leicestershire
Charities for disabled people based in the United Kingdom
Foreign charities operating in Tanzania
Foreign charities operating in the Gambia
Organizations established in 2014